In Celtic mythology, Argadnel (celtic: Maig Arggatnéul, meaning "plain of silver cloud") one of the Islands of the Earthly Paradise that were visited by Bran the Blessed.

In 2003, the International Astronomical Union adopted the name for a regio of Europa.

References

Celtic mythology
Mythological islands